A lūʻau (also anglicized as "luau") is a traditional Hawaiian party or feast that is usually accompanied by entertainment. It may feature food such as poi, kālua puaʻa (kālua pig), poke, lomi salmon, ʻopihi, and haupia, beer, and entertainment such as traditional Hawaiian music and hula. Among people from Hawaiʻi, the concepts of "lūʻau" and "party" are often blended, resulting in graduation lūʻau, wedding lūʻau, baby lūʻau, and birthday lūʻau.

History

In ancient Hawaiʻi, men and women ate meals separately. Additionally, commoners and women were not allowed to eat foods that were rarely eaten  or foods that were only served during special occasions. However, in 1819, King Kamehameha II removed all the religious laws that were practiced. King Kamehameha II performed a symbolic act by eating with the women, thus ending the Hawaiian religious kapu (taboo) system. This is when the lūʻau parties were first created.

Food
The modern name comes from that of a food often served at a lūʻau: squid or chicken lūʻau, which consist of meat, lūʻau (or taro) leaves, and coconut milk. The main dish of the lūʻau is kālua puaʻa (kālua pig), slow-cooked in an imu (earth oven). Another dish that is served is poi, made from the roots of taro. This feast was usually served on the floor, on the mats often decorated with large centerpieces typically made of tī leaves. Utensils were never present during a lūʻau; everything was eaten by hand. For example, varieties of poi were identified by the number of fingers needed to eat it: "three-finger", "two-finger", or the thickest, "one-finger poi".

A traditional lūʻau consists of food such as:

 Chicken long rice
 Haupia
 ʻUala (Hawaiian sweet potato)
 Hawaiian sweet bread
 Kālua puaʻa (Hawaiian roast pig)
 Kulolo
 Laulau
 Lomilomi salmon
 Poi
 Poke
 Squid lūʻau or chicken lūʻau
 Tropical fruits

Lūʻau-themed parties
Lūʻau-themed or Hawaiian-themed parties vary in their range of dedication to Hawaiian traditions. For example, some extravagant affairs go so far as to ship food from the islands, while others settle for artificial lei, maitais, and a poolside atmosphere.

To have a lūʻau-themed party, it is essential to have an open area, such as a backyard, because lūʻau are celebrated under large tents in outdoor areas. Also a lei is a very common item in a lūʻau. A lei is a necklace of flowers, ferns, or kukui nuts that men and women wear. At lūʻau-themed parties, the guests can make their own lei or they can be bought. At these types of parties entertainment is a must. The instruments used are typically the ukulele, guitar and sometimes drums. There are also often hula dancers.

Some credit Donn Beach with the initial popularity and commercialization of lūʻaus within the continental United States.  A Life article from 1946 graphically displays one of his famous lūʻaus that he held in Encino, California. In a 1986 interview Beach described his role in shaping private, home based lūʻaus into larger public affairs, where he included entertainment from singers such as Alfred Apaka.

References

Further reading
 .
 .

External links

Hawaii Lūʻaus Official Website

Hawaii culture
Eating parties